Machupicchu (from Quechua Machu Pikchu, "old peak") is one of seven districts of the Urubamba Province in Peru. Its seat is the village of Machupicchu.

Geography 
The Urupampa and Willkapampa mountain ranges traverse the district. Some of the highest mountains of the district are listed below:

 K'urkur Urqu
 Phutuq K'usi
 P'allqay
 Sallqantay
 Tunki Urqu
 Wayna Pikchu

See also 
 Kusichaka River
 Machu Pikchu
 Machu Q'inti
 Pakaymayu
 Patallaqta
 Runkuraqay
 Warmi Wañusqa
 Wayna Q'inti

References

1941 establishments in Peru